Bigger is an American comedy television series executive produced by Will Packer that premiered on 	September 19, 2019 on BET+.  On February 18, 2020, BET+ announced the series was renewed for a second season which premiered on April 22, 2021. In December 2021, the series was canceled after two seasons.

Premise
Bigger follows "five thirty-somethings living in Atlanta as they try to build professional and personal lives they can be proud of, but the one thing they don't have keeps impeding their progress: love. Unresolved feelings from college are uncovered and secrets revealed, forcing these friends to finally deal with uncomfortable truths about each other."

Cast
Tanisha Long as Layne Roberts
Angell Conwell as Veronica Yates
Rasheda Crockett as Tracey Davis
Tristen J. Winger as Vince
Chase Anthony as Deon

Recurring
 Lucius Baston as Terry
 Devale Ellis as Ken

Episodes

Season 1 (2019)

Season 2 (2021)

Production
On April 11, 2018, it was announced that BET had given a series order to the production for a first season consisting of ten episodes. Will Packer was set to executive produce the series with Sheila Ducksworth and Felischa Marye serving as writers and co-executive producers. Production companies involved in the series include Will Packer Productions and Collins Entertainment. On February 18, 2020, BET+ announced the series was renewed for a second season which premiered on April 22, 2021. On December 13, 2021, the series was canceled after two seasons.

References

External links

2010s American black sitcoms
2019 American television series debuts
2020s American black sitcoms
2021 American television series endings
BET+ original programming
English-language television shows
Television shows set in Atlanta